Richard Burke (29 March 1932 – 15 March 2016) was an Irish Fine Gael politician who served as European Commissioner for Interinstitutional Relations and Administration from 1982 to 1985, European Commissioner for Taxation, Consumer Affairs, Transport and Parliamentary Relations from 1977 to 1981 and Minister for Education from 1973 to 1976. He served as a Teachta Dála (TD) from 1969 to 1976 and from 1981 to 1982.

Early life and education
Burke was born in Brooklyn, New York City, in 1932. He was raised in Upperchurch, County Tipperary, and educated at the Christian Brothers School, Thurles. He went on to study at University College Dublin (UCD) and King's Inns. He worked as a teacher before embarking on a political career.

Political career
His first political involvement was with the Christian Democrat Party founded by Seán Loftus. However, he soon became a member of Fine Gael, becoming a member of Dublin County Council in 1967. Two years later, in 1969, he was elected to Dáil Éireann for the first time, becoming a TD for Dublin County South. He was immediately appointed Fine Gael Chief Whip by party leader Liam Cosgrave.

In 1973, a new Fine Gael–Labour Party coalition government was formed, and Burke was appointed Minister for Education. He joined the Taoiseach, Liam Cosgrave, in voting against the government's own Control of Importation, Sale and Manufacture of Contraceptives Bill 1974. In December 1976, he was nominated as Ireland's European Commissioner, chosen ahead of fellow minister Justin Keating of Labour to succeed Patrick Hillery, who returned to become President of Ireland. Burke resigned his seat in the Dáil in January 1977 to take up his position.

He took office in the Jenkins Commission as commissioner for taxation, consumer affairs, transport. On the completion of his four-year term as a European commissioner, he accepted an invitation to stand at the 1981 general election for Fine Gael in June, on returning to Ireland from Harvard University after his fellowship year at Leverett House from 1980 to 1981. He was elected a TD for Dublin West.

However, Burke was not appointed to the short-lived cabinet of Garret FitzGerald. At the February 1982 election, he retained his seat, but Fine Gael lost office. Charles Haughey formed a minority Fianna Fáil government with the support of independent deputies. Haughey's government nominated Burke for acceptance by the European Council and European Parliament as a European commissioner, avoiding a depletion of the government's numbers. Being appointed for the second time his seniority resulted in his nomination as a vice-president of the Commission.

Later life and death
After Burke left politics at the Irish and European levels, he became president and chief executive officer of the Stichting Canon Foundation in Europe, roles he held until his retirement in 1998.

Burke married Mary in 1968, and they had six children. Burke died on 15 March 2016 in Dublin. He was predeceased by his son Joseph.

References

1932 births
2016 deaths
Irish European Commissioners
Fine Gael TDs
Members of the 19th Dáil
Members of the 20th Dáil
Members of the 22nd Dáil
Members of the 23rd Dáil
Ministers for Education (Ireland)
People from New York (state)
Politicians from County Tipperary
Councillors of Dublin County Council
Alumni of University College Dublin
Alumni of King's Inns
European Commissioners 1977–1981
European Commissioners 1981–1985